Priolo Gargallo (Sicilian: Priolu) is a comune (municipality) in the Province of Syracuse, Sicily (southern Italy).

The name Priolo Gargallo comes from the nobleman Marquis Gargallo who owned land in this part of Sicily.

Priolo Gargallo borders the following municipalities: Melilli, Syracuse, Solarino, Sortino.

Economy

References

External links
  Official website

Cities and towns in Sicily
Municipalities of the Province of Syracuse